Val de Garonne Agglomération is the communauté d'agglomération, an intercommunal structure, centred on the town of Marmande. It is located in the Lot-et-Garonne department, in the Nouvelle-Aquitaine region, southwestern France. Created in 2011, its seat is in Marmande. Its area is 669.2 km2. Its population was 60,226 in 2019, of which 17,421 in Marmande proper.

Composition
The communauté d'agglomération consists of the following 43 communes:

Agmé
Beaupuy
Birac-sur-Trec
Calonges
Castelnau-sur-Gupie
Caubon-Saint-Sauveur
Caumont-sur-Garonne
Clairac
Cocumont
Couthures-sur-Garonne
Escassefort
Fauguerolles
Fauillet
Fourques-sur-Garonne
Gaujac
Gontaud-de-Nogaret
Grateloup-Saint-Gayrand
Jusix
Lafitte-sur-Lot
Lagruère
Lagupie
Longueville
Marcellus
Marmande
Le Mas-d'Agenais
Mauvezin-sur-Gupie
Meilhan-sur-Garonne
Montpouillan
Puymiclan
Saint-Avit
Saint-Barthélemy-d'Agenais
Sainte-Bazeille
Saint-Martin-Petit
Saint-Pardoux-du-Breuil
Saint-Sauveur-de-Meilhan
Samazan
Sénestis
Seyches
Taillebourg
Tonneins
Varès
Villeton
Virazeil

References

Val de Garonne
Val de Garonne